is a city in the prefecture of Hokkaido, Japan, located in the southern reaches of Kamikawa Subprefecture, under whose jurisdiction it resides. Well known throughout Japan as a tourism destination, it is famous for its lavender fields, the television drama Kita no Kuni kara and the Furano Ski Resort, which held the Snowboarding World Cup in recent years. As of September 2016, the city has an estimated population of 22,715 and a density of 38 persons per km2 (98 persons per sq. mi.).

History 
The city takes its name from the Ainu word "Fura-nui," which means "Stinky Flame" or "Foul-Smelling Place," in the language of the indigenous people of Hokkaido.  This is most likely because the valley was associated with sulfuric fumaroles near Tokachi Peak.  In 1897 the first homesteaders arrived from Mie Prefecture and settled in what is now the Ogiyama area of the city.  The Village of Furano was established as a satellite settlement of the then-preeminent Utashinai Village. In 1899 the settlement was transferred from under the jurisdiction of Sorachi County to Kamikawa County, an official town hall was raised, and Furano Village, Sorachi County was officially established.

Mass transportation soon followed when a railway link to Asahikawa, what is now the second largest city in Hokkaido, was opened in 1900.  Three years later, Furano was divided into the upper Kamifurano Village (the present-day town of Kamifurano) and the lower Shitafurano Village (present-day Furano and Minamifurano.)  In 1908, Minamifurano Village (now a town) established itself as an autonomous municipality.  On April 1, 1915, Yamabe Village was created as a separate municipality, and Shimofurano, Sorachi County gained Second Class Village Status in the Hokkaido Village System.  Following rapid development, on April 1, 1919, Shitafurano Village achieved town status and was renamed Furano Town. It gained First Class Town Status exactly two years later. During the closing stages of World War II, Furano was bombed by American naval aircraft in July 1945. On September 30, 1956, Furano annexed the village of Higashiyama. Ten years later, Furano annexed the town of Yamabe and the population boost was enough for it to become a full-fledged city.  Furano officially changed its name to Furano City on May 1, 1966.

Economy

Industry 
The keystone industry is agriculture, which is centered on onions and carrots. Furano notably produces more carrots than anywhere else in Japan. Watermelon and the Akaniku-brand "Furano Melon" are also produced in large numbers.

Industry also includes tourism, particularly to its lavender fields and ski slopes, as well as the cultivation of grapes, including a municipally-managed winery, and dairy products such as milk and cheese. Furano Delice, made famous for being the first candy factory to put pudding in a milk bottle, is well known for its Furano Milk Pudding.

Agricultural co-op 
Furano Agricultural Cooperative (JA Furano)

Local business 
 Daisy Food Production Industries, Inc. – Furano Factory (デイジー食品工業株式会社富良野工場)

Financial institutions 
 North Pacific Bank, Ltd., Furano Office
 Hokkaido Bank, Ltd., Furano Office
 Asahikawa Credit Union, Furano Office (formerly Furano Credit Union)
 Hokkaido Workers Credit Union, Furano Office
 Sorachi Commercial Credit Association, Furano Office

Postal services 
 Furano Post Office (the Furano Office of Japan Post Service Company, Ltd. is located within the same building.)
 Furano Wakaba Post Office (includes ATM service)
 Kitanomine Post Depot (postal service only)
 Rokugo Post Office

Public service institutions

Police 
 Furano Police Station

Sister cities

Domestic 
 Furano partnered with Nishiwaki City, Hyōgo Prefecture on October 20, 1978, becoming Furano's first and only domestic Sister City association.
  Nishiwaki（Hyōgo Prefecture）

Abroad 
 Furano has been sister cities with Schladming, Austria since February 23, 1977.
  Schladming（Austria）

Regional

Education 
 High School
 Public High Schools
 Hokkaido Furano High School, Hokkaido Furano Ryokuho High School
 Technical Schools
 Furano Nursing College
 Middle Schools
 Furano Higashi, Furano Nishi, Jukai, Yamabe
 Elementary Schools
 Furano, Ogiyama, Higashi, Torinuma, Furebetsu, Jukai, Yamabe
 Elementary/Middle Schools
 Rokugo, Nunobe

Transportation

Airport 
 Asahikawa Airport is located south of Asahikawa's city center in the outlying town of Higashi Kagura. It is approximately an hour away from Furano by bus or car.

Railways 
 Hokkaido Railway Company (JR Hokkaido)
 Nemuro Line: Shimanoshita – Furano – Nunobe – Yamabe
 Furano Line: Gakueden – Furano

Bus 
 Furano Bus – city bus lines, Furano to Asahikawa (the "Lavender Express")
 Shimukappu municipally owned and operated Furano to Shimukappu bus line.
 Hokkaido Chuo Bus Co., Ltd. – Furano to Sapporo (the high-speed "Furano")
 Dohoku Bus Co., Ltd., Hokkaido Takusyoku Bus Co., Ltd., Tokachi Bus Co., Ltd. – Minamifurano to Obihiro (Northliner)

Highways 
 National Highways
 Highway 38
 Highway 237
 Prefectural Highways
 Hokkaido Route 135 – Bibai, Furano
 Hokkaido Route 253 – Higashiyama, Furano
 Hokkaido Route 298 – Kamifurano, Asahikawa, Nakafurano
 Hokkaido Route 544 – Rokugo, Yamabe
 Hokkaido Route 706 – Nanyou, Yamabe
 Hokkaido Route 759 – Nae, Furano
 Hokkaido Route 800 – Kitanomine
 Hokkaido Route 985 – Yamabe, Kitanomine

Historic sites, tourism destinations, festivals

Cultural heritage 
Furano Traditional Chinese Lion Dance – The Furano Traditional Chinese Lion Dance Preservation Society is a part of the Furano City Lifelong Learning Center.
A monument marking the exact geographic center of Hokkaido is located in the playground of Furano Nishi Junior High School.
Groundbreaking Memorial for the Hokkaido University Satellite Research Farm No.8, Furano Campus – Tenmangu Shrine Grounds
Groundbreaking Memorial for the Hokkaido University Satellite Research Farm No.8, Yamabe Campus – Yamabe Shrine Grounds

Tourism destinations 

 Downtown District
 Kita no Kuni kara (北の国から) Museum is located almost directly adjacent to the Furano Station area.
 Gokokuzanfurano-ji – (護国山富良野寺) or Eighteenth Hokkaido Sanjuusan Sacred Grounds of Kannon Fudasho (北海道三十三観音霊場十八番札所).  Since Furano is Hokkaido's Navel Town, they proudly display a duplicate of the Buddha Nyoirinkannon Heso Ishi (Navel Stone) from Kyoto's famous temple Choho-ji.

 Kitanomine District
 The Kitanomine Area is centered on ski resorts and pensions.  Furano Ski Resort, owned and operated by Prince Hotels, is a popular winter destination for people from around the world.  Ningle Terrace is a rustic sort of shopping village located just to the side of New Furano Prince Hotel. The word “Ningle” refers to a 15 cm-tall character known as The Wise Man of the Forest from a book with the same title that was written by So Kuramoto. The shopping area was created based on the writer's ideas. Open year-round, people from all over the area come to browse the handmade trinkets and look for faeries when the snow has not buried them alive.  There is also a shop based on the one Takeshita Keiko (竹下景子) worked at in the 'Kita no Kuni kara'　(北の国から) television drama.
 Furano Cheese Factory
 Furano Ice Milk Factory
 Furanoengekikoujou – Furano Theatre Factory (富良野演劇工場), a non-profit organization established and run by the city, Furano Theater Factory is a small-scale theater that strives to meet the creative needs of its citizens, hosting a myriad of events year-round. The Theater Factory was designed by Sou Kuramoto, the famous writer of Kita no Kuni kara.

 Rokugo District
 The houses used by the characters in the television drama 'Kita no Kuni kara'　(北の国から) can still be found in the far-reaches of the Furano city limits in the Rokugo area, separated from Furano Station by a distance of about 15 kilometers.  Rokugo Forest was the setting for the drama's early period.  Gotaro's Stone House, The Lost and Found House, Jun and Ketsu's House, and Yahataoka, a hilly, back-country setting that came up frequently throughout the series, can all be found perfectly preserved in a memorial-esque open-air museum.
 Rokugo Observation Deck
 Furano Jam Farm
 Anpanman Shop
 Furano Music Box
 Popuri Village specializes in cultivating late-blooming Lavender, meaning visitors can see the purple flowers in all their glory, even if they have missed the season.

 Other districts
 Highland Furano is a public spa in Shimanoshita, complete with a mid-sized lavender field.
 The city owns and operates a successful wine factory known as the Wine House.
 Furano Wine and Juice Factory is a publicly run business located in Shimizuyama.
 Torinuma Park is a public park famous for the fact that it never freezes, even though it is located in the heart of snow country, Japan.  Camping is not allowed, however visitors are more than encouraged to camp in the nearby Yamabe Village of the Sun Nature Park.

Dramas staged in Furano 
 Kita no Kuni kara (Fuji Terebi, 1981–2002)
 Yasashii Jikan (Fuji Terebi, 2005)
 Kaze no Gaaden (Fuji Terebi, 2008)

Festivals and other events 
 Shoukon Festival – Peace Memorial Festival (June 15–16)
 Hokkaido Belly Button Festival (July 28–29)
 Furano Shrine's Annual Festival (August 25–26)

Miscellaneous

Immigration 
 In May, 2009 Furano City joined hands with various private-sector associations to establish the Furano Chamber for the Promotion of Immigration.

Geography 
The Furano Valley is nestled between the Tokachi Volcanic Mountain Range (part of the Daisetsuzan National Park) and the Yuubari cluster of summits, including Ashibetsu Peak. The Sorachi and Furano Rivers, both tributaries of the Ishikari River, meet within the city limits. Furano is located at the exact geographic center of Hokkaido, earning it the nickname "Heso no Machi" or "Navel Town."

Roughly 70% of the city is mountain and forest. In 1899, the Tokyo University Forest in Hokkaido was established for research purposes in the southeast sector of the city.  Nearby lies Rokugo Forest, the setting for the well-known Japanese television drama Kita no Kuni Kara.

Climate
Furano has a humid continental climate (Köppen Dfb) with warm and occasionally hot and humid summers with high rainfall coupled with cold and extremely snowy winters. For its latitude and being on an island, Furano's winters are extremely cold.

Accent 
There is a difference in the way that those living in Hokkaido (citizens of Furano included) and those that live in other parts of Japan pronounce the city's name.  Inside Hokkaido, the first syllable in "Furano" is stressed; however in the rest of Japan the typical pattern of equally and weakly stressed syllables is predominant.  The latter pronunciation was used in the drama that made Furano famous, even though it was in contradiction to the local accent.

Notable people 
 Tetsuya Kumakawa – ballet dancer
 Kazumi Kurigami – professional photographer
 Seiji Sugio – singer
 Masami Shimoda – anime producer, director
 Chika Miura – actress
 Isao Fujii – businessman, founder and principal owner of Takaragi Staff Service Co., Ltd.

Mascot 

He is a farmer who likes to see peoples' navels. He is originally the mascot for the Hokkaido Belly Button Festival before becoming the mascot of the city when he debuted on 15 August 1969. His favourite quote is "Isn't it good?" (イイじゃないか).

Cultural references 
Furano Milk Pudding is famous for being the first pudding ever to come in a glass bottle.

Television program Kotaete Choudai'''s King of Reruns, Fukushima Katsushige, relocated to Furano in January 2007.  He said that he would not return to Tokyo until he had sold 10,000 units of the DVD he made.  He embarked on a journey across the length of Japan, traveling from Kagoshima to Furano on a bicycle selling the DVDs.  In Furano, he donned a self-assembled facsimile of the Hokkaido mascot Marimokkori's costume, dubbing himself Shigemokkori, and became the talk of the town by prancing around in green full-body tights complete with a conspicuous bulge (a la Hokkaido's beloved character.)  He updates his blog, CD Furano, almost every day.

Niko Niko Pun, a children's television show run by NHK, is shot on location in Furano every Summer and Winter Break.

 Mass communications 
 Daily Furano (newspaper)
 Radio Furano (community FM station) 77.1 MHz
 Hokkaido Shimbun'', Furano (newspaper)

See also 
 List of cities in Japan

References

External links 

 Official Website 
 Furano Tourism Association 富良野観光協会
 Biei Wedding Palace 日の出公園ラベンダー園での結婚式 

Cities in Hokkaido
Tourism in Japan